Yoel Alejandro Hernández (born April 15, 1980) is a Venezuelan former professional baseball relief pitcher, who played in Major League Baseball (MLB) for the Philadelphia Phillies.

Career
Hernández was signed by the Philadelphia Phillies as a free agent in 1998 and was added to the Phillies 40-man roster prior to the 2005 season. At the time he owned the best slider in the organization, according to Baseball America.

From 2000 through 2006, Hernández posted a 34–36 record with a 3.45 ERA and 17 saves in 204 games at five different levels. In 2000, he was selected to the Gulf Coast League All-Star team. He then started 2007 with the Triple-A Ottawa Lynx, where he went 1-0 with a 1.74 and six saves before joining the Phillies in May as a replacement for injured Tom Gordon.

In between, Hernández has pitched for several teams of the Mexican League as well as for the Águilas del Zulia, Leones del Caracas and Navegantes del Magallanes clubs of the Venezuelan Winter League.

He was selected to the roster for the Venezuela national baseball team at the 2015 WBSC Premier12.

See also
 List of Major League Baseball players from Venezuela

References

External links

Yoel Hernández at Baseball America
Yoel Hernández at MiLB.com

1980 births
Living people
Águilas del Zulia players
Broncos de Reynosa players
Clearwater Phillies players
Clearwater Threshers players
Diablos Rojos del México players
Guerreros de Oaxaca players
Florida Complex League Phillies players
Lakewood BlueClaws players
Leones del Caracas players
Major League Baseball pitchers
Major League Baseball players from Venezuela
Mexican League baseball pitchers
Navegantes del Magallanes players
Olmecas de Tabasco players
Ottawa Lynx players
People from Ciudad Bolívar
Philadelphia Phillies players
Reading Phillies players
Scranton/Wilkes-Barre Red Barons players
Vaqueros Laguna players
Venezuelan expatriate baseball players in Canada
Venezuelan expatriate baseball players in Mexico
Venezuelan expatriate baseball players in the United States
World Baseball Classic players of Venezuela
2009 World Baseball Classic players
2015 WBSC Premier12 players